Mandabe is a town and commune in Madagascar. It belongs to the district of Mahabo, which is a part of Menabe Region. The population of the commune was estimated to be approximately 27,000 in 2001 commune census.

An airport serves the commune. Primary and junior level secondary education are available in town. The town provides access to hospital services to its citizens. The majority 95% of the population of the commune are farmers, while an additional 4.5% receives their livelihood from raising livestock. The most important crop is rice, while other important products are peanuts and cassava.  Services provide employment for 0.5% of the population.

Geography
The town is situated at the Maharivo River and is the endpoint of the RN 9.

Personalities
Andre Resampa (1924-1993), minister of interior

References and notes 

Populated places in Menabe